Jean Marie Lozano (born 22 October 1967) is a Filipino-American former professional tennis player.

Lozano, a three-time NCAA All-American at UC Berkeley, competed on the WTA Tour and ITF circuit during the late 1980s and early 1990s. She had best rankings of 433 for singles and 227 for doubles.

Originally from the Philippines, Lozano played Federation Cup tennis for her native country in 1993, appearing in ties against Thailand and Indonesia. She was a mixed doubles gold medalist at the 1993 Southeast Asian Games.

ITF finals

Singles: 3 (0–3)

Doubles: 9 (4–5)

References

External links
 
 
 

1967 births
Living people
Filipino female tennis players
American female tennis players
California Golden Bears women's tennis players
Southeast Asian Games medalists in tennis
Southeast Asian Games gold medalists for the Philippines
Southeast Asian Games silver medalists for the Philippines
Southeast Asian Games bronze medalists for the Philippines
Competitors at the 1993 Southeast Asian Games
American sportspeople of Filipino descent